Jozef Moravčík (born 19 March 1945) is a Slovak diplomat and political figure. He served as the prime minister of Slovakia from 16 March 1994 to 13 December 1994, and later as the Mayor of Bratislava.

References 
 Profile at the Ministry of Foreign Affairs of the Czech Republic

1945 births
Living people
Prime Ministers of Slovakia
Foreign Ministers of Slovakia
Mayors of Bratislava
People from Zvolen District
Foreign ministers of Czechoslovakia
Members of the National Council (Slovakia) 1994-1998